Renée Vivien (born Pauline Mary Tarn; 11 June 1877 – 18 November 1909) was a British poet who wrote in French, in the style of the Symbolistes and the Parnassiens. A high-profile lesbian in the Paris of the Belle Époque, she is notable for her work, which has received more attention following a recent revival of interest in Sapphic verse. Many of her poems are autobiographical, pertaining mostly to Baudelarian themes of extreme romanticism and frequent despair. Apart from poetry, she wrote several works of prose, including L'Etre Double (inspired by Coleridge's Christabel), and an unfinished biography of Anne Boleyn, which was published posthumously. She has been the object of multiple biographies, most notably by Jean-Paul Goujon, André Germain, and Yves-Gerard Le Dantec.

Early life
Renée Vivien was born Pauline Mary Tarn in London, England to a wealthy British father, John Tarn, and an American mother. John Tarn earned his wealth from property investments. In 1883, while attending the Belsize College in Hampstead, London, the Alliance française awarded a silver medal to her for her study of French in France. Vivien was attending  school in Paris when her father died in 1886. Upon his death, Vivien returned to London to find that her father's inheritance was given to her. Purportedly, Vivien's mother attempted to declare Vivien legally insane so that she could have her husband's inheritance money instead. The plot failed, and Vivien was taken away from her mother to live as a ward of the court until she came of age. In 1899, after she turned 21, Vivien returned to France with the inheritance money. It is around this time that she began to be known as Renée Vivien.

Relationships
Vivien harbored a romantic relationship with her closest childhood friend and neighbor, Violet Shillito – a relationship that remained unconsummated. Shillito introduced Vivien to the American heiress, Natalie Barney. The following year Shillito died of typhoid fever, Vivien felt culpable for her death and felt guilty for sidelining Shillito in favour of Barney. Perhaps because of this death, but likely also in part to Barney's infidelities, Vivien and Barney split a year later, in 1901. It is thought that Shillito is mentioned in Vivien's poems using the word violet or purple.

After the death and breakup, Vivien became depressed and turned to drugs and alcohol.

In 1902 Vivien became romantically involved with the immensely wealthy Baroness Hélène van Zuylen, one of the Paris Rothschilds. Though a lesbian, Zuylen was married and the mother of two sons. Zuylen provided much-needed emotional support and stability. Zuylen's social position did not allow for a public relationship, but she and Vivien often travelled together and continued a discreet affair for a number of years.  In letters to her confidant, the French journalist and Classical scholar Jean Charles-Brun, Vivien considered herself married to the Baroness. 

While still with Zuylen, Vivien received a letter from a mysterious admirer in Istanbul, Kérimé Turkhan Pasha, the wife of a Turkish diplomat. This launched an intensely passionate correspondence, followed by brief clandestine encounters. Kérimé, who was French-educated and cultivated, nevertheless lived according to Islamic tradition. Isolated and veiled, she could neither travel freely nor leave her husband. Meanwhile, Vivien would not give up the Baroness de Zuylen.

In 1907 Zuylen abruptly left Vivien for another woman, which quickly fueled gossip within the lesbian coterie of Paris. Deeply shocked and humiliated, Vivien fled to Japan and Hawaii with her mother, becoming seriously ill on the voyage. Another blow came in 1908 when Kérimé, upon moving with her husband to Saint Petersburg, ended their affair.

Vivien was terribly affected by these losses and accelerated into a psychological downward spiral, already in motion. She turned increasingly to alcohol, drugs, and even attempted suicide by taking laudanum, an opium derivative; the attempt failed but left her partially paralysed. Falling into a downward spiral, she refused to take proper nourishment, a factor that eventually contributed to her death.

The great French writer Colette, who was Vivien's neighbour from 1906 to 1908, immortalized this period in The Pure and the Impure, a collection of portraits showing the spectrum of homosexual behaviour.  Written in the 1920s and originally published in 1932, its factual accuracy is questionable; Natalie Barney reportedly did not concur with Colette's characterization of Vivien. Yet it remains a rare glimpse of the poet's life, written by one of her contemporaries.

Published works 
Vivien only wrote in French. Some of her works have been translated.

She published her first collection of poetry,  Études et préludes, in 1901. She would go on to publish 12 more collections of poetry in her lifetime, as well as her own translations of Sappho's verses from Greek (the language she learnt specifically for the purpose). Contemporary feminists consider her one of the first women to write openly lesbian poetry.

In 1904, Vivien originally published A Woman Appeared to Me (in French), an autobiographical novel. In 1976, it was translated to English by Jeanette Foster and published by Naiad Press. Naiad also published a translation of Vivien's poetry collection, The Muse of Violets, in 1977.

Vivien also published poetry and prose in collaboration with lover, Hélène van Zuylen using the pseudonym, Paule Riversdale. The true attribution of these works is uncertain, however; some scholars believe they were written solely by Vivien. Even certain books published under Zuylen's name may be, in fact, Vivien's work.

During her brief life, Vivien was an extremely prolific poet who came to be known as the "Muse of the Violets", derived from her love of the flower. Her obsession with violets (as well as with the colour violet) was a reminder of her beloved childhood friend, Violet Shillito.

She took to heart all the mannerisms of Parnassianism and of Symbolism, as one of the last poets to claim allegiance to the school. Her compositions include sonnets, hendecasyllabic verse, and prose poetry.

Virtually all her verse is veiled autobiography written in the French language; most of it has never been translated into English. Her principal published books of verse are Cendres et Poussières (1902), La Vénus des aveugles (1903), A l'heure des mains jointes (1906), Flambeaux éteints (1907), Sillages (1908), Poèmes en Prose (1909), Dans un coin de violettes (1909), and Haillons (1910).

Her poetry has achieved greater appeal and a wider audience due to the contemporary rediscovery of the works of the ancient Greek poet Sappho, also a lesbian.

World travels
Vivien was cultivated and very well travelled, especially for a woman of her era. She wintered in Egypt, visited China, and explored much of the Middle East, as well as Europe and America.

After the heartbreak from Zuylen and Pasha, Vivien fled to Japan and then Hawaii with her mother in 1907. Vivien became ill on the voyage.

Her Paris home was a luxurious ground-floor apartment at 23, avenue du Bois de Boulogne (now 23, Avenue Foch) that opened onto a Japanese garden. She purchased antique furnishings from London and exotic objets d'art from the Far East.  Fresh flowers were abundant, as were offerings of Lady Apples to a collection of shrines, statuettes, icons, and Buddhas.

A public square is named in her honor in Paris: 'place Renée-Vivien', in Le Marais, central historic district of the French capital.

Illness and death 

Above all, Vivien romanticized death. While visiting London in 1908, deeply despondent, she tried to kill herself by drinking an excess of laudanum. She stretched out on her divan with a bouquet of violets held over her heart. The suicide failed, but while in England, she contracted pleurisy; later, upon her return to Paris, she grew considerably weaker. According to biographer Jean-Paul Goujon, Vivien suffered from chronic gastritis, due to years of chloral hydrate and alcohol abuse. She had also started to refuse to eat. By the summer of 1909, she walked with a cane.

Vivien died in Paris on the morning of 18 November 1909 at the age of 32; the cause of death was reported at the time as "lung congestion", but likely resulted from pneumonia complicated by alcoholism, drug abuse, and anorexia nervosa.  She was interred at Passy Cemetery in the same exclusive Parisian neighbourhood where she had lived.

Works 

 Études et Préludes (Paris: Alphonse Lemerre, 1901); appearing under the name R. Vivien
 Cendres et Poussières (Paris: Lemerre, first edition, 1902; second edition, 1903)
 Évocations (Paris: Lemerre, 1903)
 Sapho (Paris: Lemerre, 1903)
 Du Vert au Violet (Paris: Lemerre, 1903); first collection appearing under the name Renée Vivien
 Une Femme m’apparut (Paris: Lemerre, first edition, 1904; second edition, 1905)
 La Dame à la louve (Paris: Lemerre, 1904).
 Les Kitharèdes (Paris: Lemerre, 1904)
 La Vénus des Aveugles (Paris; Lemerre, 1904)
 À l’Heure des Mains jointes (first edition, 1906; second edition, 1909)
 Flambeaux éteints (Edward Sansot & Cie, 1907)
 Le Christ, Aphrodite et M. Pépin(E. Sansot, 1907)
 Chansons pour mon Ombre (Paris: Lemerre, 1907); appearing under Pauline M. Tarn
 Plusieurs Proses ironiques et satiriques (1907)
 L’Album de Sylvestre (Sansot, 1908)
 Sillages (Sansot, 1908)
 Poèmes (Paris: Lemerre, 1909); published posthumously
 Anne Boleyn (1909)
 Poèmes en Prose (Sansot, 1909)
 Dans un Coin de Violettes (Sansot, 1910)
 Le Vent des vaisseaux (Sansot, 1910)
 Hallions (Sansot, 1910)

Gallery

See also
 Lesbian Poetry

References

Bibliography
 Renée Vivien, Lilith's Legacy: Prose Poems and Short Stories, translated by Brian Stableford (Snuggly Books, 2018)
 Renée Vivien, A Crown of Violets, translated by Samantha Pious (Headmistress Press, 2015)
 Renée Vivien, The Muse of the Violets: Poems by Renée Vivien, translated by Margaret Porter and Catherine Kroger (Tallahassee, Florida: Naiad Press, 1982)
 Renée Vivien, A Woman Appeared to me, translated by Jeannette Foster (1904, Reno, Nevada: Naiad Press, 1974)
 Renée Vivien, At the Sweet Hour of Hand in Hand: translated from the French with an introd. by Sandia Belgrade ; foreword by editor and collaborator Bonnie Poucel, The Naiad Press, 1979
 Renée Vivien, Woman of the Wolf and Other Stories. Translated by Karla Jay and Yvonne M. Klien. Introduction by Jay. Gay Press of New York; December 1983.
 Natalie Clifford Barney, Adventures of the Mind (New York: New York University Press, 1992)
 Colette, The Pure and the Impure (New York: Farrar Straus, 1967)
 Jean-Paul Goujon, Tes Blessures sont plus douces que leurs Caresses: Vie de Renée Vivien (Paris: Cres, 1986)
 André Germain, Renée Vivien (Paris: Regine Desforges, 1986)
 Karla Jay, The Amazon and the Page: Natalie Clifford Barney and Renee Vivien (Bloomington: Indiana University Press, 1988)
 Paul Lorenz, Sapho, 1900: Renée Vivien (Paris: Julliard, 1977)
 Renée Vivien, Irina Ionesco, Femmes Sans Tain (Paris: Bernard et Tu et Secile, 1975). Collection of gothic poetry and portraits, introduction by Renée Vivien, all text in French.

External links

1877 births
1909 deaths
19th-century English poets
19th-century English women writers
Belle Époque
British emigrants to France
British lesbian writers
British writers in French
Burials at Passy Cemetery
Deaths from anorexia nervosa
English lesbian writers
English LGBT poets
English people of American descent
English women poets
French-language poets
Lesbian poets
Neurological disease deaths in France
Symbolist poets